Mutellina is a genus of flowering plants belonging to the family Apiaceae.

Its native range is Europe.

Species:

Mutellina caucasica 
Mutellina corsica 
Mutellina purpurea

References

Apioideae
Apioideae genera